Betamethasone/dexchlorpheniramine (trade names Betadexin, Celabet, Celestamine) is a drug containing betamethasone and dexchlorpheniramine maleate to treat allergic conditions.  Betamethasone is a steroid to relieve itches and inflammation while dexchlorpheniramine maleate is an antihistamine to treat urticaria.

References

Allergology
Antihistamines
Corticosteroids
Combination drugs